Population

Bholath is a town and a nagar panchayat in Kapurthala district  in the state of Punjab, India. Bholath was town of raja Bharat. Khassan is a village near to Bholath which is approximately 2.4 km.

Demographics
 India census, Bholath had a population of 10,548. Males constitute 53% of the population and females 47%. Bholath has an average literacy rate of 70%, higher than the national average of 59.5%; with male literacy of 75% and female literacy of 65%. 11% of the population is under 6 years of age.

Bholath is a fast development town. It is mainly recognize as NRI Area. Many of persons from this surrounding area go abroad for good earning. There are some good schools in The Bholath as Christ the King Convent School, Satkartar International High School , Ajanta Model School( Sh. ved parkash), Shishu Model senior secondary School (Sh. Krishan Lal Sharma Ji), Young Petals Public  School.

From- Bholath People.

References

Cities and towns in Kapurthala district